Amsterdam Island is a small island off the northwest coast of West-Spitsbergen. It is separated from Danes Island by the strait Danskegattet. Its total area is 16.8 km2. Its highest point is Hiertabreen, at 472 meters above sea level. The percentage of the island covered in ice is 11.5%.

History

Amsterdam Island was first seen by Willem Barents in 1596. The Dutch first occupied it in 1614 (the year in which it was probably named), building a temporary whaling station on the island's southeastern promontory. In 1619 a semi-permanent station was constructed. It came to be called Smeerenburg (Dutch for "Blubber Town"). The settlement went into decline in the 1640s, and was abandoned sometime before 1660.

References

Conway, W. M. 1906. No Man's Land: A History of Spitsbergen from Its Discovery in 1596 to the Beginning of the Scientific Exploration of the Country. Cambridge: At the University Press. 
 Norwegian Polar Institute Place Names of Svalbard Database

 
Islands of Svalbard
Former Dutch colonies
17th century in the Dutch Empire
1614 establishments in the Dutch Empire
Whaling in the Dutch Republic